Nachman Wolf (1951 – 15 February 2022) was an Israeli Paralympic athlete who competed mainly in category F41 throw events.

Biography
Wolf competed at a total of five Paralympics for Israel, his first games in  Stoke Mandeville/New York in 1984 were his most successful as he picked up gold in the discus and shot put and silver in the javelin and pentathlon missing out on gold to Sweden's Raymond Clark in both events.  Four years later in Seoul at the 1988 Summer Paralympics Nachman finished sixth in the pentathlon won a second silver in the javelin added a silver in the shot put and defended his title in the discus. After finishing way down the field in each of the throws in 1992, Nachman returned in 1996 finishing fourth in both the shot and javelin, he won a silver in the discus. He returned for a last time in the 2000 Summer Paralympics where he competed in a wheelchair in all three throws but failed to add to an impressive medal tally. Wolf died on 15 February 2022, at the age of 70.

References

External links
 

1951 births
2022 deaths
Paralympic athletes of Israel
Athletes (track and field) at the 1984 Summer Paralympics
Athletes (track and field) at the 1988 Summer Paralympics
Athletes (track and field) at the 1992 Summer Paralympics
Athletes (track and field) at the 1996 Summer Paralympics
Athletes (track and field) at the 2000 Summer Paralympics
Paralympic gold medalists for Israel
Paralympic silver medalists for Israel
Medalists at the 1984 Summer Paralympics
Medalists at the 1988 Summer Paralympics
Medalists at the 1996 Summer Paralympics
Paralympic medalists in athletics (track and field)
Israeli male discus throwers
Israeli male javelin throwers
Israeli male shot putters